9m88 is a jazz, R&B, and pop musician from Taiwan.

Biography 
9m88 was born in 1990. She  majored in fashion design at Shih Chien University. At age 25, she went to The New School for Jazz and Contemporary Music.  9m88 released her debut album “Beyond Mediocrity”  independently in August 2019. In October 2021, 9m88 performed with the Cloud Gate Dance Theater.

Music style 
After arriving in New York as a Jazz voice major, she has broadened her interest in various genres of music, including Jazz, R&B, Pop, and Free Improvisation. Baba is also known for infusing her music with vivid and retro visuals. Her lyrics usually deal with personal bitter-sweet stories on a daily basis. The release of her 7-inch vinyl “Nine Head Hinano”, including a cover of City Pop classic “Plastic Love”, has helped her increase followers over the world.

Activism 

9m88 recorded a track for the album T-POP: No Fear In Love, a compilation album celebrating the one-year anniversary of the legalization of same-sex marriage in Taiwan, with others including Enno Cheng.

Discography

Studio albums

Singles/Collaborative Singles 
 Weekends With You - Leo Wang (feat.9m88) (2016)
 Air Doll (2017)
 Walking Towards Me (feat. 馬念先) (2019)
 B.O. - ØZI (feat. 9m88) (2018)
 Everybody Woohoo - Wu Tsing-fong (feat. 9m88) (2018)
 為i篩檢 (2019)
 Aim High (2019)
 Hello Bye Bye (2020)
 Strange Weather - 9m88 & YELLOW (2020)
 Stay A While - TOSHIKI HAYASHI(%C) (feat.9m88) (2020)

Television 
Light the Night (2021)

Awards  
2018 ELLE Taiwan Elle Style Awards - ‘The Most Stylish Future Star’

Tour 
29 February 2020 - New Taipei City
8 April 2020 - Santa Cruz, California

References

External links 
 https://9m88.co/
 https://open.spotify.com/artist/3fqDEwlDymFObOMMSKSVHS

1990 births
Living people
Musicians from Taipei
Taiwanese pop musicians
Women jazz musicians
Shih Chien University alumni
Taiwanese expatriates in the United States